The 1994 All-Ireland Minor Football Championship was the 63rd staging of the All-Ireland Minor Football Championship, the Gaelic Athletic Association's premier inter-county Gaelic football tournament for boys under the age of 18.

Cork entered the championship as defending champions, however, they were defeated by Kerry in the Munster semi-final.

On 18 September 1994, Kerry won the championship following a 0-16 to 1-7 defeat of Galway in the All-Ireland final. This was their 11th All-Ireland title and their first title in six championship seasons.

Results

Leinster Minor Football Championship
First Round

Second Round

Semi-FinalsFinal

Connacht Minor Football Championship
First RoundSemi-Final

Final

Munster Minor Football Championship

First round

Semi-final

Final

Ulster Minor Football Championship

First round

Second round

Second round replay

Semi-final

Final

All-Ireland Minor Football Championship 

Semi-Finals

Final

References

1994
All-Ireland Minor Football Championship